Superman Returns is a 2006 film directed by Bryan Singer.

Superman Returns may also refer to:

 Superman Returns (novel), a novelization of the film written by Marv Wolfman
 Superman Returns (soundtrack), a soundtrack album for the 2006 film
 Superman Returns (video game), a video game based on the film
 Superman Returns: Fortress of Solitude, a video game for the Game Boy Advance
 The Return of Superman (TV series), a South Korean reality-variety show